{{DISPLAYTITLE:C9H10Cl2N4}}
The molecular formula C9H10Cl2N4 (molar mass: 245.10 g/mol, exact mass: 244.0283 u) may refer to:

 Aganodine
 Apraclonidine

Molecular formulas